"Shed a Tear" is a song by Scottish band Wet Wet Wet from their first greatest-hits album, End of Part One. It was released as a single on 25 October 1993 and reached  22 on the UK Singles Chart.

Track listings
CD single
 "Shed a Tear"
 "Everyday"
 "Deadline"

7-inch and cassette single
 "Shed a Tear"
 "Everyday"

Charts

References

Wet Wet Wet songs
1993 singles
1993 songs
Songs written by Graeme Clark (musician)
Songs written by Marti Pellow
Songs written by Neil Mitchell (musician)
Songs written by Tommy Cunningham